al-Qubayba, also known as Gbebah, Qubeiba or Qobebet Ibn 'Awwad, was a Palestinian village, located 24 kilometers northwest of Hebron. It was depopulated in the 1948 Arab–Israeli War.

Name
The eponym of the village, "Ibn 'Awwad" or "Ibn 'Awadh", was named after the clan residing therein.

History
Known in Crusader times as Deirelcobebe, the ruins of the ancient Canaanite and Judean city of Lachish lay adjacent to the village, which was subject to extensive archaeological excavations by the British Mandatory authorities in Palestine, and by Israeli authorities subsequent to its capture during the 1948 Arab-Israeli war.

In  1136 the  King of Jerusalem, Fulk confirmed Deirelcobebe as a casale under the Knights Hospitallers.

Ottoman period
In 1517, Al-Qubayba was incorporated into the Ottoman Empire with the rest of  Palestine, and in 1596  it appeared in the  tax registers as being in the nahiya (subdistrict) of Gaza under the liwa' (district) of Gaza. It had a population of 33 Muslim household, an estimated  182 persons. They paid a fixed tax-rate of 25 % on agricultural products, including  wheat, barley, sesame, and fruit trees, as well as goats and beehives; a total of 4,600 akçe. 11/24 of  the revenue went to a Waqf.

In 1838 Edward Robinson noted 200 reapers and gleaners at work in a field near Al-Qubayba (which he called Kubeibeh). He added: "Some were taking their refreshment, and offered us some of their "parched corn." In the season of harvest, the grains of wheat, not yet fully dry and hard, are roasted in a  pan or an iron plate, and constitute a very palliative article of bread; this is eaten along with bread, or instead of it." Robinson further noted  Kubeibeh as a Muslim village, in the Gaza district.

In 1883, the PEF's Survey of Western Palestine described Al-Qubayba  as a large village built of adobe brick, situated on rolling hills near a plain, surrounded by a barren and stony area.

British Mandate era
In the 1922 census of Palestine conducted  by the British Mandate authorities, Al-Qubaiba had a population of 646, all Muslims, increasing in  the 1931 census to 800, still all Muslim, in a total of  141 houses.

The village had a school, a mosque, and a number of small shops.

In the 1945 statistics  the population of Al-Qubayba was  1,060, all  Muslims,  who owned  11,912  dunams of land  according to an official land and population survey. 8109   dunams were for cereals while 35 dunams were built-up (urban) land.

1948 and aftermath
Al-Qubayba was in the territory allotted to the Arab state under the 1947 UN Partition Plan.

The village was first attacked during Operation Barak. Though defended by Egyptian forces, al-Qubayba was taken by Israeli forces in the final stages of Operation Yoav on 28 October 1948. The population had fled and the village was destroyed.

The area was subsequently incorporated into the State of Israel and in 1955 the moshav of Lakhish was established to the southwest of the village site on what had been village lands.

Of the village mosque, an elementary school, and more than 141 houses that made up al-Qubayba, Walid Khalidi notes that all that remains to mark the site in contemporary times are cacti and a handful of olive trees.

Culture and village life
The inhabitants of the village mostly grew cereals; wheat and barley were grown by the well off, and corn by the rest. The village mostly bartered with surrounding villages such as Al-Dawayima and Beit Gibrin, most of the cereals harvest was used to sustain sheep herds, from where in most of the village income is derived.

A woman's thob (loose fitting robe with sleeves), from Qubeiba dated to about 1910 forms part of the Museum of International Folk Art (MOIFA) collection at Santa Fe. The dress is a collage of different fabrics, textures and colors. The front and the upper half of the back are of black cotton. The chest panel, the side panels and the lower back of the skirt are handwoven indigo linen. Colorful silk cross-stitch embroidery, in red, violet, orange, yellow, green and black, create an effect described as "particularly gay, twinkling" The qabbeh (square chest panel) is embroidered with the qurunful ("clove") motif, and it has vertical rows of eight-pointed stars, called qamr ("moons"), and a row of the mushut ("combs") pattern. There are eight embroidered columns on each side panel of the dress. The patterns which are used are fanajin qahweh ("coffee cups"), khem-el-basha ("the pashas tent"), irq el-ward ("rose branch"), and miftah Khalil ("key of Hebron"). There is also a pattern (with flowers, moons, trees, tents and tiles) not seen anywhere else in the MOMA collection. Finally, there is also some embroidery at the wrists.

See also
Depopulated Palestinian locations in Israel
List of villages depopulated during the Arab-Israeli conflict
Palestinian costumes

References

Bibliography

 
 
 
  
 

  
 

  (A catalog of the  Museum of International Folk Art (MOIFA) at Santa Fe's  collection of Palestinian clothing and jewelry.)

External links
Welcome to al-Qubayba
 al-Qubayba (Hebron), Zochrot
Survey of Western Palestine, Map 20: IAA, Wikimedia commons 

Arab villages depopulated during the 1948 Arab–Israeli War
District of Hebron